Legion of Los Angeles (stylized as L39ION of Los Angeles) is a UCI Continental cycling team based in the United States. It was founded in 2019 by brothers Justin Williams and Cory Williams with the goal of increasing diversity and inclusion in cycling. The "39" in the name represents 39th Street in Los Angeles, where the Williams brothers grew up.

It was announced in November 2020 that the team would be stepping up to UCI Continental level in 2021, while a women's team would also be formed.

Team rosters

Men's Continental team

Women's team

Major wins

Men 
2019
 , Justin Williams
 Stage 3 Valley of the Sun Stage Race, Cory Williams
 Stages 1 & 2 Tulsa Tough, Justin Williams

2020
 Overall Tour of Murrieta, Cory Williams
Stages 1 & 2, Cory Williams

2021
  National Road Race Championships, Eder Frayre
  National Road Race Championships, Justin Williams
 Boise Criterium, Justin Williams
 Overall Prairie State Series, Tyler Magner
Stage 1, Alexander Cowan
Stages 3, 5, 6, 7 & 8, Tyler Magner
 Littleton Criterium, Cory Williams
 Athens Criterium, Tyler Williams
 Overall Joe Martin Stage Race, Tyler Williams
Stage 1, Tyler Williams
Overall Gateway Cup, Cory Williams
Stages 1, 2, 3 & 4, Cory Williams
 Overall Tulsa Tough, Cory Williams
Stage 1, Justin Williams
Stage 2, Cory Williams
Stage 3, Tyler Williams
 Overall Pro Road Tour, Tyler Williams
 Sea Otter Classic
Stage 1, Alexander Cowan
Stage 2, Freddy Ovett

2022
 Stage 3 Joe Martin Stage Race, Sam Boardman

Women 
2021
  National Criterium Championships, Kendall Ryan
 Overall Tulsa Tough, Skylar Schneider
Stage 1, Skylar Schneider
Stage 2, Kendall Ryan
Stage 3, Skylar Schneider
  Overall Joe Martin Stage Race, Skylar Schneider
Stages 1 & 4, Skylar Schneider
  National Road Race Championships, Amber Joseph
  National Time Trial Championships, Amber Joseph
 Caribbean Road Race Championships, Amber Joseph

2022
Stage 1 Joe Martin Stage Race, Skylar Schneider
  National Road Race Championships, Amber Joseph
  National Time Trial Championships, Amber Joseph

World, Continental & National Championships

Men 
2021
  Mexico Road Race, Eder Frayre
  Belize Road Race, Justin Williams

Women 
2021
  United States Criterium, Kendall Ryan
  Barbados Road Race, Amber Joseph
  Barbados Time Trial, Amber Joseph

2022
  Barbados Time Trial, Amber Joseph
  Barbados Road Race, Amber Joseph

References

External links 
 
 

Cycling teams established in 2019
Cycling teams based in the United States
UCI Continental Teams (America)